Julio César Rodríguez Secco (born in Montevideo, Uruguay, on 20 September 1968) is a former Uruguayan footballer. He played for Liverpool (U) of Uruguay, San Martín of Argentina, and UE Lleida and Numancia of Spain.

External links
 Profile at Tenfield
 BDFA profile

1968 births
Living people
Uruguayan footballers
Uruguayan expatriate footballers
Uruguay international footballers
Uruguayan Primera División players
Segunda División players
Peñarol players
Racing Club de Montevideo players
Danubio F.C. players
Liverpool F.C. (Montevideo) players
C.A. Cerro players
CD Numancia players
UE Lleida players
San Martín de Tucumán footballers
Expatriate footballers in Spain
Expatriate footballers in Argentina
Association football midfielders